Innocent Madede Mbonihankuye (born 5 November 1996) is a professional footballer who plays as a goalkeeper for AS Port. Born in Burundi and emigrated to Djibouti, he represented the Burundi national team in two friendlies, before switching to represent the Djibouti national team.

Career
Born in Burundi, Mbonihankuye debuted with the Burundi national team in a friendly 0–0 tie with Kenya on 15 July 2014. In 2015, he moved to Djibouti and was naturalized as a citizen. He switched to represent Djibouti in 2019, as he was not cap tied to Burundi due to only playing 2 friendlies with them. He debuted with Djibouti in a 2–1 2022 FIFA World Cup qualification win over Eswatini on 4 September 2019.

Honours
LLB Académic
 Burundi Premier League: 2013-14

References

External links
 

1996 births
Living people
People from Gitega Province
Djiboutian footballers
Djibouti international footballers
Burundian footballers
Burundi international footballers
Burundian emigrants to Djibouti
Djiboutian people of Burundian descent
Association football goalkeepers
Burundi Premier League players
Djibouti Premier League players
Dual internationalists (football)